Unreal is the first in a series of collections of short stories by Australian author Paul Jennings. It was first released on June 6, 1985.

The stories

Without a Shirt
A boy called Brian has a speech impediment that forces him to say "Without a shirt" each time he finishes a sentence. When he is forced to move to a new house in the center of a cemetery because his dog is repeatedly digging, he eventually finds some bones that may be linked to his speech impediment. After fulfilling the task involving the bones and a shirt, he loses the speech impediment. Was later adapted as an episode of Round The Twist, although "without a shirt" was changed to "without my pants".

The Strap-Box Flyer
A conniving salesman named Giffen sells a glue that will stick to anything, but stops working after four hours. After getting many innocent townspeople to buy it, he leaves town in his truck before they can track him down for cheating them, then meets a man who has invented a box that can make people fly into the sky. Attempting to try it for himself leads to the biggest mistake of his life.

Skeleton on the Dunny
A boy called Bob was forced to live with his aunt because of his parents' deaths, but the only toilet at his aunt's house is in an outhouse. Even worse, that outhouse is haunted by the ghost of a man who was dead after looking after the house when the aunt was on a holiday. Was later adapted as the first episode of Round The Twist.

Lucky Lips
A boy who has never been kissed obtains a lipstick that will make nearby girls kiss him. However, it also works on any female, including animals. Was later adapted as an episode of Round The Twist.

Cow Dung Custard
Greg has a father who grows vegetables that are tremendous because of all the dung he uses to grow them. The worst batches are one that cannot be smelled, but attracts flies, and one that smells so incredibly bad that it gets him in trouble with the neighbours, but also kills flies.
At the end, Greg and his father get into trouble.

Lighthouse Blues
A boy comes to an island to help an old lighthouse keeper. However, every Friday night, music plays, and the boy suspects it has something to do with the lighthouse keeper's ancestors. Stan (the lighthouse keeper) is the son of the captains son. He is unable to hear the music because it was his ancestors' music. The boy is unable to see the body of the ancestors when he visits the music room. The boy tells the bad news to the invisible ancestors and they do not respond because they are ghosts but they listen. The bad news was that they were going to break the lighthouse and make a new one but they tried their hardest not to let them break it.

Smart Ice-Cream
An ice-cream seller has special ice-creams that have effects such as making people happier, shortening peoples' noses, removing pimples, and making people smarter. A smart boy who is always top of the class gets jealous, because he never ever gets any of the ice-cream and also because one of his classmates becomes as good as him, so he ruins the ice-cream business by destroying all the ice-cream except the one that makes people smarter. He then proceeds to eat that one, only to find out that it actually makes people less smart.

Wunderpants
A boy is given underpants that, despite their look that would cause him to be teased by the school bully, give him superhuman strength. But when he takes a break during a cross-country race (he is first by a wide margin), those underpants start to shrink, and the bully eventually comes to steal the rest of his clothes. He ends up going home in the nude, causing him to be grounded, but he eventually enters a mouse race in which the winner gets 50 dollars. The boy wins the mouse race by giving the mouse the pants. Was later adapted as an episode of Round The Twist.

References

External links
The book on Paul Jennings's site

1985 short story collections
Books by Paul Jennings (Australian author)
Australian children's books
Australian short story collections
BILBY Award-winning works
COOL Award-winning works
1985 children's books
Penguin Books books